Charles Francis Brittain is an American philosopher currently the Susan Linn Sage Professor at Cornell University. He specializes in ancient philosophy, specifically Hellenistic philosophy. His work lies within the Platonic tradition and draws on texts from Cicero, Augustine, and Simplicius.

References

Year of birth missing (living people)
Living people
Cornell University faculty
American philosophers